The Protectorate of South Arabia consisted of various states located at the southern end of the Arabian Peninsula under treaties of protection with Britain. The area of the former protectorate became part of South Yemen after the Radfan uprising and is now part of the Republic of Yemen.

History

The Protectorate of South Arabia was designated on 18 January 1963 as consisting of those areas of the Aden Protectorate that did not join the Federation of South Arabia, and it broadly, but not exactly, corresponded to the division of the Aden Protectorate which was called the Eastern Aden Protectorate.

The protectorate included the Hadhrami states of Kathiri, Mahra, and Qu'aiti except the three Wahidi Sultanates in the Eastern Aden Protectorate, with Upper Yafa in the Western Aden Protectorate.  The Protectorate of South Arabia was dissolved on 30 November 1967 and its constituent states quickly collapsed, leading to the abolition of their monarchies. The territory was absorbed into the newly independent People's Republic of South Yemen, which became part of the Republic of Yemen in 1990.

States 

Former states of the British Aden Protectorate were united in the 1960s to form the People's Republic of South Yemen, which became independent on 30 November 1967. South Yemen later merged with North Yemen to form the modern state of Yemen in 1990.

List of rulers

See also

South Yemen

References

External links
Official Website of the Al-Quaiti Royal Family of Hadhramaut

 
Former countries in the Middle East
States and territories established in 1963
1963 establishments in Asia
States and territories disestablished in 1967
1967 disestablishments in Asia
Former countries
South Arabia
Former British protectorates